Mathieu Le Scornet (born 2 May 1983) is a French football manager. He was the manager of RC Strasbourg Alsace for 6 games in 2023.

Managerial statistics

References

External links
 

1983 births
Living people
People from Metz
Sportspeople from Metz
French football managers
RC Strasbourg Alsace managers
Ligue 1 managers